Jupiter Ganymede Orbiter (JGO) was a part of the international Europa Jupiter System Mission (EJSM). It was a proposed orbiter by the ESA slated for lift-off in 2020. Plans for the mission include detailed studies of Jupiter's moons Ganymede and Callisto as well as the Jovian magnetosphere.

It was superseded by Jupiter Icy Moon Explorer.

See also
Europa Jupiter System Mission – Laplace
Jupiter
Ganymede
Europa

References

External links
EJSM @ NASA

Proposed NASA space probes
Europa Jupiter System Mission – Laplace
Ganymede (moon)